The 1922 American Cup tournament was not held. In accordance with new rules passed by the USFA, the American Football Association did not conduct a tournament for the 1921-22 season. The hiatus was brief, though, with the tournament resuming the following season.

History
On previous occasions the tournament was either diminished or not held. The period from 1899-1905, the tournament was not held because the AFA had disbanded, for mostly economic reasons. In 1905 the opportunity  for re-establishment arose and the tournament resumed. 

The tournament was next affected in the 1916-17 season, by rules adopted in the Southern New England FA. With Massachusetts teams forced to choose just  one out-of-state tournament, most chose the National Challenge Cup. The 1917 edition went on as planned, but the AFA suffered a financial loss from the withdrawals of the Massachusetts squads.

Ruling
The situation in 1922 was far more serious. The USFA established a new rule that allowed only for State Cup competitions in addition to the National Cup. With the AFA operating out of New Jersey, the new ruling would not allow for the other major districts that regularly took part in the American Cup (NE, NY, and E.Pa.) to compete, leaving only New Jersey participating. Thus, with an insufficient number of entries to conduct a viable tournament, the AFA was forced to abandon the 1922 edition.

Holders
The Robins Dry Dock squad of Brooklyn had won the two previous editions of the tournament, the second of which was paired with a National Challenge Cup win to complete 'the double'.  Robins had merged with the Tebo Yacht Basin team to become the Todd Shipyards, which finished runner-up in the 1922 National Cup, giving credibility to a potential repeat as American Cup champions had they been able to defend their title. Many of the Todds players made their way to Paterson F.C. for the 1922/23 season, strengthening them sufficiently to win the National Cup; however, they fell shy of the American Cup, losing out in the semifinals.

New Jersey State Cup
Aside from the National Challenge Cup the next highest level of tournament competition for New Jersey teams was the State Cup. The professional ASL team from Harrison benefited from not having any of their counterparts hailing from New Jersey as they easily won the State Championship. Harrison was only able to defeat the American Cup holders one time in five attempts, one being an elimination from the Eastern Semifinal of the NCC.

See also
1922 National Challenge Cup

References

Amer
American Cup